Marion Lake is an unorganized territory in Saint Louis County, Minnesota, United States. The population was 68 at the 2000 census.

Pequaywan Lake Road (Saint Louis County Road 44) serves as a main route in the area.

Nearby places include North Star Township and Pequaywan Township.

Geography
According to the United States Census Bureau, the unorganized territory has a total area of 36.2 square miles (93.8 km2), of which 35.5 square miles (91.8 km2) is land and 0.8 square mile (2.0 km2) (2.13%) is water.

Demographics
At the 2000 census there were 68 people, 24 households, and 19 families living in the unorganized territory. The population density was 1.9 people per square mile (0.7/km2). There were 36 housing units at an average density of 1.0/sq mi (0.4/km2).  The racial makeup of the unorganized territory was 100.00% White.
Of the 24 households 45.8% had children under the age of 18 living with them, 70.8% were married couples living together, 4.2% had a female householder with no husband present, and 20.8% were non-families. 12.5% of households were one person and none had someone living alone who was 65 or older. The average household size was 2.83 and the average family size was 3.05.

The age distribution was 30.9% under the age of 18, 2.9% from 18 to 24, 29.4% from 25 to 44, 30.9% from 45 to 64, and 5.9% 65 or older. The median age was 41 years. For every 100 females, there were 112.5 males. For every 100 females age 18 and over, there were 95.8 males.

The median household income was $40,313 and the median family income  was $27,292. Males had a median income of $35,417 versus $16,875 for females. The per capita income for the unorganized territory was $13,446. There were no families and 1.2% of the population living below the poverty line, including no under eighteens and none of those over 64.

References

Populated places in St. Louis County, Minnesota
Unorganized territories in Minnesota